Oskar Johansson (born 23 June 1977) is a Canadian world class sailor from Toronto.

He won the ICSA Men's Singlehanded National Championship in 2000 and competed in Sailing at the 2004 Summer Olympics in Athens, Greece and finished in 15th place. At the 2008 Summer Olympics, he finished 4th in the Tornado Class with partner Kevin Stittle.

Career highlights

Results:
 Silver Medal – Tornado Class – World Championships – 2008
 Gold Medal – Sunfish Class – Pan Am Games – 1999
 4th place – Tornado Class – Olympic Games – 2008
 Gold Medal – Tornado Class – French World Cup (Hyeres) – 2007
 15th Place – Tornado Class – Olympic Games – 2004
 Silver Medal – Sunfish Class – World Championships – 2000
 Gold Medal – Laser Class – ISCA North American Singlehanded Championships – 1999–2000 season
 7x Canadian Tornado Champion – 2002–08
 2x North American Tornado Champion – 2006–07
 Canada's Cup 2011

Awards:
 Canadian Rolex Sailor of the Year - 2012
 Sport Alliance of Ontario – Team of the Year Finalist – 2008
 Canadian Yachting Association – Male Athlete of the Year – 2008
 2 x Ontario Sailor of the Year – 2000, 2008
 ICSA All American Honorable Mention – 2001

References

External links
 
 
 
 

1977 births
Living people
Canadian male sailors (sport)
Olympic sailors of Canada
Sailors at the 2004 Summer Olympics – Tornado
Sailors at the 2008 Summer Olympics – Tornado
Pan American Games gold medalists for Canada
Sailors at the 1999 Pan American Games
Canadian people of Swedish descent
Sportspeople from Oakville, Ontario
Pan American Games medalists in sailing
Queen's Golden Gaels sailors
Medalists at the 1999 Pan American Games